ISO 3166-2:ZM is the entry for Zambia in ISO 3166-2, part of the ISO 3166 standard published by the International Organization for Standardization (ISO), which defines codes for the names of the principal subdivisions (e.g., provinces or states) of all countries coded in ISO 3166-1.

Currently for Zambia, ISO 3166-2 codes are defined for 10 provinces.

Each code consists of two parts, separated by a hyphen. The second part is two digits (01–10).

Current codes

Subdivision names are listed as in the ISO 3166-2 standard published by the ISO 3166 Maintenance Agency (ISO 3166/MA).

Click on the button in the header to sort each column.

Changes

The following changes to the entry are listed on ISO's online catalogue, the Online Browsing Platform:

See also
 Subdivisions of Zambia
 FIPS region codes of Zambia

External links
 ISO Online Browsing Platform: ZM
 Provinces of Zambia, Statoids.com

2:ZM
ISO 3166-2
Zambia geography-related lists